Lami is a surname and a unisex given name. People with the name include:

Surname
 Adel Lami (born 1985), Qatari football player
 Alessandro Lami (1949–2015), Italian philologist
 Alphonse Lami (1822–1867), French sculptor
 Annie Lami, Italian literary translator
 Basilio Lami Dozo (1929–2017), Argentine military officer
 Edgardo Lami Starnuti (1887–1968), Italian lawyer and politician
 Eugène Lami (1800–1890), French painter and engraver
 Giovanni Lami (1697–1770), Italian jurist and antiquarian
 Mitì Vigliero Lami (born 1957), Italian journalist
 Stanislas Lami (1858–1944), French sculptor
 Waleed Salim Al-Lami (born 1992), Iraqi football player

Given name
 Fati Lami Abubakar (born 1951), Nigerian jurist 
 Lami Phillips, Nigerian musician and actress
 Lami Yakini (born 1985), Congolese football player

See also
 Lami, disambiguation page

Unisex given names